Egglescliffe is a village and civil parish in County Durham, England.  Administratively it is located in the borough of Stockton-on-Tees. It shares a civil parish with Eaglescliffe.

The village sits on top of a hill overlooking and across the River Tees from Yarm and had a 2001 population of around 595, while the civil parish had a population of 7,908, increasing to 8,559 at the 2011 Census.

There is a small public play area, farms, allotments and a public house (called the Pot and Glass) in the village. The education establishment in the village is a Church of England primary school while the nearby Egglescliffe School (secondary and sixth-form) is in the parish.

History

North of the River Tees was not recorded in the 1068 Domesday Book. The parish church is dedicated to St John the Baptist and there has been a place of worship on the site since the twelfth century.

Bishop Skirlaw of Durham built a stone bridge, across the Tees in 1400 which still stands. An iron replacement was built in 1805, but it fell down in 1806.

Governance
It was in the palatinate of Durham (the prince-bishop of Durham's domain) from its establishment until 1836 when it became a standard type of county. 1974 reforms lead to Egglescliffe being placed under the Stockton district of Cleveland county. The district became a unitary authority in 1996 and a part of the ceremony county Durham.

Etymology
The second element of Egglescliffe is from Old English clif, 'steep slope'. The first element has been etymologised as Latin ecclesia 'church' or the form it took when borrowed into Cumbric, represented today by Welsh eglwys. However, the first element could also be from an Anglo-Saxon personal name like Ecgi or Ecgel, in which case the name means 'Ecgel's steep slope'.

Geography 

The parish is divided by railway lines, such as the Tees Valley line and Northallerton–Eaglescliffe line. Vehicles can only get from the east to west of the parish to its far south or into the Preston parish, there are two pedestrian bridges and an underpass.

The parish includes the villages of Egglescliffe, Eaglescliffe and Urlay Nook. They are also multiple housing estates; Millfield, Kingsmead, Sunningdale, Hunters Green and Orchard Estate.

The main road through eastern parish is the A135 Yarm Road which was part of the old route of the A19 until the 1970s when it was diverted east of Thornaby. The A67 runs through the west of the parish. Nearby large towns include Stockton-on-Tees (north), Middlesbrough (north east), Darlington (west) and Hartlepool (north east).

Gallery

References

External links
Egglescliffe & Eaglescliffe parish council website

Places in the Tees Valley
Villages in County Durham
Borough of Stockton-on-Tees
Civil parishes in County Durham